Pierre Lechantre (born 2 April 1950) is a French footballer coach and former player. He won the 2000 African Cup of Nations with the Cameroon national team.

Career
On 27 April 2012, Lechantre was named as the head coach of Senegal, but failed to reach a final agreement with the Senegalese Football Federation on the terms of his contract.

In April 2018 he was one of 77 applicants for the vacant Cameroon national team job.

References

External links
 Profile
 Profile

1950 births
Living people
Footballers from Lille
Association football forwards
French footballers
Paris FC players
Lille OSC players
FC Sochaux-Montbéliard players
AS Monaco FC players
Stade Lavallois players
RC Lens players
Olympique de Marseille players
Stade de Reims players
Red Star F.C. players
French football managers
Qatar national football team managers
Mali national football team managers
Paris FC managers
Al-Rayyan SC managers
Cameroon national football team managers
Al-Sailiya SC managers
Al-Ahli Saudi FC managers
Al-Arabi SC (Qatar) managers
CS Sfaxien managers
Club Africain football managers
2000 African Cup of Nations managers
Congo national football team managers
French expatriate football managers
French expatriate sportspeople in Cameroon
Expatriate football managers in Cameroon
French expatriate sportspeople in Qatar
Expatriate football managers in Qatar
French expatriate sportspeople in Saudi Arabia
Expatriate football managers in Saudi Arabia
French expatriate sportspeople in Mali
Expatriate football managers in Mali
French expatriate sportspeople in Morocco
Expatriate football managers in Morocco
French expatriate sportspeople in Libya
Expatriate football managers in Libya
French expatriate sportspeople in the Republic of the Congo
Expatriate football managers in the Republic of the Congo
French expatriate sportspeople in Tanzania
Expatriate football managers in Tanzania